Hythe was a constituency centred on the town of Hythe in Kent. It returned two Members of Parliament to the House of Commons until 1832, when its representation was reduced to one member.  The constituency was abolished for the 1950 general election, and replaced with the new Folkestone and Hythe constituency.

Boundaries
1918–1950: The Municipal Boroughs of Folkestone and Hythe, the Urban District of Cheriton, and part of the Urban District of Sandgate.

Members of Parliament

1366-1640

1640-1832

1832-1950

Election results

Elections in the 1830s
Townsend-Farquhar's death caused a by-election.

 204 Scot and Lot votes were placed for Fraser and Kelly, but these were rejected

Marjoribanks resigned, causing a by-election.

Elections in the 1840s

Elections in the 1850s

Ramsden resigned, causing a by-election.

Elections in the 1860s

Elections in the 1870s

Elections in the 1880s

Elections in the 1890s 

Edwards' resignation caused a by-election.

Elections in the 1900s

Elections in the 1910s 

General Election 1914–15:

Another General Election was required to take place before the end of 1915. The political parties had been making preparations for an election to take place and by July 1914, the following candidates had been selected; 
Unionist: Philip Sassoon
Liberal: William Deedes

Elections in the 1920s

Elections in the 1930s 

The Liberal candidate, Hester Holland withdrew on 14 Oct 1931

Philby was a candidate for the British People's Party.

Elections in the 1940s

Notes

References
Citations

Bibliography
 
 
 
 
 
 
 

Folkestone and Hythe District
Parliamentary constituencies in Kent (historic)
Constituencies of the Parliament of the United Kingdom established in 1366
Constituencies of the Parliament of the United Kingdom disestablished in 1950
Cinque ports parliament constituencies